John Randolph is the name of:
John Randolph, 3rd Earl of Moray (1306–1346), 3rd Earl of Moray, regent of Scotland
John Randolph (politician) (1693–1737), Virginia colonial politician, Speaker of the Virginia House of Burgesses
John Randolph (loyalist) (1727–1784), Virginia colonial leader, loyalist in the American Revolution
John Randolph (Bishop of London) (1749–1813), British cleric, professor and diocesan bishop (of Oxford, then of Bangor, then of London)
John Randolph (Bishop of Guildford) (1866–1936), British cleric, suffragan bishop and dean
John Randolph of Roanoke (1773–1833), Virginia "Old Republican" politician and political theorist
John Randolph (actor) (1915–2004), American actor
John Randolph, better known by his deejay name Jay Smooth, founder of New York City's longest-running hip hop radio program
Jack Webb (John Randolph Webb, 1920–1982), actor and star of Dragnet, who used John Randolph as a pseudonym
John Randolf (MP), member of parliament for Malmesbury
John Randolph (cricketer) (1821–1881), English cricketer and clergyman